The , or  was a powerful military alliance between the feudal domains of Satsuma and Chōshū formed in 1866 to combine their efforts to restore Imperial rule and overthrow the Tokugawa shogunate of Japan.

History
The name Satchō is an abbreviation combining the names of the provinces Satsuma (present day Kagoshima Prefecture) and Chōshū (present-day Yamaguchi Prefecture), two of the strongest Imperialist tozama domains in Edo-period Japan.

In the 1860s, Satsuma tended to take a moderate position towards maintenance of the status quo, whereas Chōshū had become the center of an uprising aimed at overthrowing the government. Through the mediation of Sakamoto Ryōma of Tosa Domain (present day Kōchi Prefecture), Satsuma military leaders Saigō Takamori and Ōkubo Toshimichi were brought together with Katsura Kogorō of Chōshū Domain. Although the two domains were traditionally fierce enemies, their leaders agreed that the time was right for a change, and agreed in principle to assist one another in the event that either would be attacked by a third party. Also, Chōshū desperately needed modern weapons, but had very limited contacts with the western powers. Satsuma, on the other hand, had developed a substantial arms trade with Great Britain via Thomas Glover, a Scottish merchant affiliated with Jardine Matheson. At the suggestion of Sakamoto, Saigo helped broker an agreement to supply Chōshū with the weapons it needed to fight the Tokugawa shogunate.

Despite this assistance, there was still considerable distrust between the two domains. On March 1, 1866, the Shogunate demanded the retirement and confinement of Chōshū daimyō Mōri Takachika and the reduction of domain revenues by 100,000 koku. This enraged the Chōshū leadership, and led to a formal, six-point agreement with Satsuma. The scope of the agreement was fairly limited. Satsuma agreed to assist Chōshū in obtaining a pardon from the Imperial Court. If this failed and the Shogunate attacked, Satsuma would send 2000 troops to Kyoto; however, Satsuma would engage the Shogunate in combat only if Kuwana, Aizu or Tokugawa Yoshinobu's personal guard attempted to block Satsuma's access to the Emperor.

The Alliance was crucial in enabling Chōshū to withstand a punitive expedition mounted by the Tokugawa shogunate in the summer of 1866, which led to a stunning defeat for the Tokugawa armies. During the subsequent Boshin War of 1867–1868, the imperial armies which finally overthrew the Shogunate were primarily samurai from the Satchō alliance. With the establishment of the Meiji Restoration, men from these two domains dominated the new Meiji government into the 20th century.

Notes

References
 Gordon, Andrew. (2003). A Modern History of Japan: From Tokugawa Times to the Present. Oxford: Oxford University Press. ; ;  OCLC 49704795
 Jansen, Marius B. (2000). The Making of Modern Japan. Cambridge: Harvard University Press. ;  OCLC 44090600 ida
 Ravina, Mark. (2004). The Last Samurai: The Life and Battles of Saigo Takamori. Hoboken, New Jersey: Wiley. ;  OCLC 427566169

Meiji Restoration
19th-century military alliances